Aviv Azaria (born November 2, 1991) is an Israeli footballer.

Club career statistics
(correct as of May 2012)

Honours
 Toto Cup (Leumit)
 2011
 Liga Leumit
 2011-12

References

External links
 

1991 births
Living people
Israeli footballers
Maccabi Netanya F.C. players
Hapoel Ramat Gan F.C. players
Maccabi Herzliya F.C. players
Hapoel Beit She'an F.C. players
Maccabi Jaffa F.C. players
Israeli Premier League players
Liga Leumit players
Footballers from Netanya
Israeli people of Moroccan-Jewish descent
Association football forwards